The Best Illusion of the Year Contest is an annual recognition of the world's illusion creators awarded by the Neural Correlate Society. The contest was created in 2005 by professors Susana Martinez-Conde and Stephen Macknik as part of the European conference on Visual Perception in La Coruna, Spain. It has since transitioned to an online contest where everyone in the world is invited to submit illusions and vote for the winner.

The contest decides on the most impressive perceptual or cognitive illusion of the year (unpublished, or published no earlier than the year prior to the most recent competition). An illusion is a perceptual or cognitive experience that does not match the physical reality (i.e. the perception of motion where no such motion physically exists).

As human experience is generated indirectly by brain mechanisms that interact with the physical reality, the  study of illusions offers insight into the neural bases of perception and cognition. The community includes neuroscientists, ophthalmologists, neurologists, and visual artists that create illusions to help discover the neural underpinnings of illusory perception.

The Best Illusion of the Year Contest consists of three stages: submission, initial review, and voting of winners. The initial review is conducted by a panel of  judges who are world experts in the science, art, and science education. The judge panel narrows the submissions to the Top Ten finalists, and viewers from all over the world can vote for the winner online. The top three winners receive cash awards.

Neural Correlate Society 

The Neural Correlate Society (NCS) is a nonprofit 501(c)3 organization that promotes research into the neural basis of perception and cognition. The organization serves a community of neuroscientists, ophthalmologists, neurologists, and artists who use a variety of methods to help discover the underpinnings of the human experience.

The NCS hosts a variety of events, including the  Best Illusion of the Year Contest, that highlight important new discoveries to the public.

Champions of Illusion

The Illusions

Award Recipients 

The following table details the first, second, and third place recipients from each year of the contest since its inception.

References

Optical illusions
Competitions
Optical phenomena
Consciousness studies